The USCGC Cochito (WPB-87329) is an  Marine Protector cutter operated by the United States Coast Guard.

Design

The Marine Protector class of cutters is the smallest of the Coast Guard's cutters, normally carrying a crew of 10 or 11.  The class is the first of its size designed to be able to accommodate crews of mixed genders.  The class was the first to be equipped with a stern launching ramp, that allows the deployment or retrieval of a high speed, pursuit  boat, without first bringing the cutter to a stop.  Only one crew member is required on deck to assist with the deployment or retrieval.

Operational career

The Cochito was one of the Coast Guard resources mobilized to provide security in January 2013, for President Barack Obama's inauguration.

In August 2018 the Cochito participated in a hunt for two missing boaters, for the Bahamas.

In December 2021 the Cochito and her sister ships Albacore and Gannet were sold to the Uruguayan Navy.

References

External links
 

Marine Protector-class coastal patrol boats
2001 ships
Ships built in Lockport, Louisiana